Neembuu Uploader (also known as NU) is a highly portable free and open-source Java application that uploads files simultaneously to multiple filehosts. It is currently supporting 67 file hosting sites and lets you manage the download and delete URLs of the uploaded files.

Features
 Portable
 Platform independent (Microsoft Windows, Linux, Mac, ..); runs on Java 1.7 or higher
 Upload several files in parallel
 Supports about 110 one-click hosters
 Auto update
 Theme Support
 Multilingual
 Drag and Drop
 File uploading with login support
 Retry failed uploads
 Retrieve download & delete URL links
 Set upload limit bandwidth
 Changing order of upload dynamically

Future
In 2014, the Neembuu team released a new product called Neembuu Now.
This new application allows users to watch and download videos at the same time.
When a user forwards the video, the previous buffer is not deleted, unlike in YouTube and other similar streaming websites. It is planned that Neembuu Uploader and Neembuu Now would be merged in the future.

References

External links
Upload tập tin lên 30 dịch vụ chia sẻ cùng lúc với Neembuu Uploader (Vietnamese)

File managers